During the 2018–19 season, CD Leganés are participating in La Liga and Copa del Rey.

Players

Reserve team

Out on loan

Transfers

In

Out

Competitions

Overall

La Liga

League table

Results summary

Results by round

Matches

Copa del Rey

Round of 32

Round of 16

Statistics

Appearances and goals
Last updated on 18 May 2019

|-
! colspan=14 style=background:#dcdcdc; text-align:center|Goalkeepers

|-
! colspan=14 style=background:#dcdcdc; text-align:center|Defenders

|-
! colspan=14 style=background:#dcdcdc; text-align:center|Midfielders

|-
! colspan=14 style=background:#dcdcdc; text-align:center|Forwards

|-
! colspan=14 style=background:#dcdcdc; text-align:center| Players who have made an appearance or had a squad number this season but have been loaned out or transferred
|-

|-
|}

Goalscorers
5 goals

References

CD Leganés seasons
Leganés